Team Racing was a NASCAR Camping World Truck Series team. It was owned by former driver Phil Bonifield. The team fielded multiple trucks, usually with sponsorship from Red Line Oil and the Coverall Carports.

Truck No. 23 history 
Team Racing made its debut in 1999 at Evergreen Speedway, under the banner Team 23 Racing. Bonifield qualified the No. 23 truck 29th but finished 30th after suffering fuel pump failure early in the race. Jerry Kobza ran the truck two races later at Memphis Motorsports Park, but dropped out early due to engine failure. Bonifield ran the truck for most of the year, posting thirteen more starts and a best finish of 30th twice, finishing 31st in points. Kobza was supposed to share the ride with Bonifield during the season, but did not qualify for his attempts and soon left the team. David Starr ran two races in the 23 at Portland and Watkins Glen, finishing 31st and 29th, respectively. Boris Said also drove in a one-race deal at Richmond International Raceway, finishing seventeenth, and Tom Bambard ran the 23 at California Speedway, finishing 22nd. Rick McCray attempted Texas Motor Speedway, but failed to qualify.

The team returned in 2000, with Bonifield as the primary driver. He ran eight races and had a best finish of 30th at Nazareth Speedway. Carl Long ran at Texas and finished seventeenth, and Bill Lester ran at Portland, finishing 24th. In 2001, Bonifield started the year running the 23, but moved over to pilot trucks owned by Impact Motorsports. Dana White took over at Memphis Motorsports Park, finishing 20th. Lance Hooper and Michael Dokken both ran one race apiece in the 23, before Bonifield finished out the year for the team.

Bonifield’s best finish in seven starts the No. 23 in 2002 was 31st at Milwaukee. Emerson Newton-John ran the truck for one race at Loudon, finishing 31st.  Hooper ran the truck for a pair of races, before White, Bonifield, and Wayne Edwards took over for the rest of the year.

In 2003, White and Bonifield started out the year, before Jamie Aube took over briefly. Bonifield ran thirteen races in the 23 that season, his best finish 24th at Kentucky Speedway, White’s best finish was 32nd at Las Vegas Motor Speedway, and Aube’s best run a 33rd at Texas. Alex Müller also ran a race at Indianapolis Raceway Park, finishing 26th. At the end of the season, the 23 team stopped running in the Truck series, as its equipment was sold to Bill Davis Racing.

Truck No. 25 history 

The 25 truck made its debut in 2002 after Bonifield purchased Impact's equipment when the team closed its doors. The organization, newly named Team Racing, debuted the 25 truck at the MBNA America 200 . Ronnie Hornaday started and finished 28th after suffering engine failure. Dokken, Brian Tyler, White, Brian Rose, and Barry Bodine all ran one race apiece in the 25 before Bonifield finished out the year for the team. The 25 truck made its debut the next season when Aube finished 36th at Lowe's Motor Speedway. Wayne Edwards took over for a pair of races, his best finish 36th at Texas. Aube also ran two races in the 25, his best finish 35th at Las Vegas. In 2004, Bonifield ran four races in the 25, before the team closed its doors.

Truck No. 86 history 
Like the 25, Bonifield and Mazzuchi purchased the 86's equipment from the defunct Impact Motorsports in 2002. Under the Team Racing banner, the 86 made its debut in the beginning of 2002 at the Florida Dodge Dealers 250 with Bonifield driving. He finished 35th. Wayne Edwards made two starts in the 86 in 2002, his best finish 25th at the Darlington 200. Then White drove the 86 for six races, his best finish a 24th twice. Donnie Neuenberger also attempted a race, but failed to qualify. Lance Hooper finished the year in the 86, his best finish a sixteenth at South Boston Speedway. After Hooper left during Daytona 2003, Bonifield drove the 86 in eight races, his  best finish a 23rd in Memphis. Rookie T. J. Bell took over for nine races. His best finish was 12th at Dover, the best finish a Team Racing driver ever posted. Brad Teague finished sixteenth at Bristol in a one-race deal, and Shane Wallace had a 26th-place finish at Texas, before Aube and Bonifield finished out the year in the truck. The team dissolved at the end of the season, despite finishing in 20th in owner's points. In 2007, the team purchased equipment from R3 Racing, and returned at the Quaker State & Lube 200 with Clay Rogers finishing 35th after a clutch failure. Dana White and Kevin Lepage drove in several races for Team Racing as well that season.

External links 
Official Website
Phil Bonifield - Owner Results
Tom Mazzuchi - Owner Results

American auto racing teams
Companies based in North Carolina
Defunct NASCAR teams
Auto racing teams established in 1999
Defunct companies based in North Carolina
1999 establishments in North Carolina